Manjalu (also Romanized as Manjalū and Manjelū; also known as Manjānlū) is a village in Qaravolan Rural District, Loveh District, Galikash County, Golestan Province, Iran. At the 2006 census, its population was 161, in 27 families.

References 

Populated places in Galikash County